VC Oudegem is a women's volleyball team based in Oudegem, a town in the municipality of Dendermonde, Belgium. The club was founded in 1978.

Since the 2010–11 season, the women's A squad plays in Ere Divisie, the highest level of the Belgian volleyball league pyramid. Their first Ere Divisie season started in 2008, in which the team did quite well and almost managed to avoid relegation playoffs. The relegation playoff itself went quite disastrous however, and Oudegem were relegated directly. They returned to the highest level immediately, after becoming champions.

VC Oudegem has a B team playing in Eerste Divisie, the third tier of Belgian women's volleyball.

Honours

National competitions
  Belgian Cup: 1
2012–13

Team squad
Season 2016–2017, as of January 2017.

References

External links
Official site 

 

Belgian volleyball clubs
Dendermonde